The Aspirantate of Don Bosco Missionary Seminary is a community of college students and young professionals in the Visayas and Mindanao regions in the Philippines, aspiring to become a Salesian of Don Bosco. The Aspirantate belongs to the Don Bosco Missionary Seminary Formation House which in turn belongs to the Salesian Province of Mary Help of Christians in the Philippine South (FIS). These institutions are being run by the Salesians of Don Bosco.

History
Upon the creation of the Province of Mary Help of Christians (FIS), the Salesian Philippine South province, the Provincial Council decided to create a formation house for Salesian Brothers in Don Bosco Technology Center in 1995. The formation house was then known as the Salesian Brothers Seminary. Years later, the formation plan evolved into admitting college students and young professionals who aspire to become Salesian Priests and Lay Brothers.

By 1998, the seminary in Don Bosco Technology Center was renamed as the Don Bosco Formation Center (DBFC).

In 2004, the province decided to gather its formation organizations into one house. Thus, DBFC was transferred to Don Bosco Missionary Seminary. Awaiting its full installation, it was ought to replace the High School Aspirantate of DBMS. The seminarians, as they are once called, stayed in the basement section of the building until the last batch of aspirants graduate from the high school aspirantate.

In March 2006, the last batch of high school aspirants graduated and paved way for the complete transfer of the College Seminary into the dormitory quarters in building. At the time, there were 38 college aspirants.

As of March 2007, the Aspirantate registered 27 aspirants, two of them being young professionals.

Formation Plan
Any young man aspiring to become a Salesian will pass through the following stages of formation:

Aspirantate
The Aspirantate serves as the seed bed of Salesian vocations for young men in college and young professionals. The recruitment starts with a talk with the Salesian Vocation Promoter, examination of the family background, and initiation into the community through the search-in program and annual summer camp.

The aspirants, as these young men are called, study in college while living together with his fellow aspirants in a community guided by their Salesian formators. Young professionals, or those young men who have finished their college education are required to stay with the college students for at least a year as immersion into the Salesian Community life. The aspirantate then acts as an immersion into the Salesian community life.

Pre-Novitiate
When a college degree had been achieved and a period of immersion has been made, the aspirant enters into a 6-month-long pre-novitiate formation followed by 2-month-long immersion in a Salesian house within the province. The pre-novitiate, or postulancy, is the period when the formandee discerns if the Salesian life is attuned to his vocation in life.

Prayer
Missionary pre-novices and the aspirants must make "Give me souls and take away all the rest" as their constant, frequent and fervent prayer in their life.

Novitiate
Novitiate should be the place of prayer,(not meaning only novitiate should be the place of prayer). Novices are to know more about the founder and his charism. They are to study and imitate him or her, admiring in him or her a splendid blending of nature and grace. In the case Salesian Novitiate novices are to study and imitate Don Bosco, admiring in him a splendid blending of nature and grace. He was deeply human, rich in the qualities of his people, open to the realities of this earth; and he was just as deeply the man of God, filled with the gifts of the Holy Spirit and living "as seeing him who is invisible".
Novices must always live their lives under the guidance of Mary the Mother of God. They must learn how to be realistic and to be attentive to the signs of the times, they must prepared themselves to live as salesians later on, everyday recalling the novitiate life. 
Novitiate is the time where the novices can prepare themselves well that they won't fall later as salesians, what you do today you will do it tomorrow. God our Father, consecrates them to Himself, they must always remember as they pass on to different stages, it is not only in the novitiate that they should remember.

Philosophy

Practical Training

Theology

Deaconate

Priesthood

On-going Formation

Location

The Aspirantate can be found in the premises of Don Bosco Missionary Seminary, Lawaan Talisay City, Cebu, 6045 Philippines.

See also
Don Bosco
Salesians of Don Bosco

External links
Official Website of the DBMS Aspirantate
Official Website of Don Bosco Missionary Seminary
Salesians of Don Bosco
Salesian Vocations

Salesian Order